is a Japanese anime character designer and director.

Biography 

In 1988, Matsubara joined Gainax. In 1996, after finishing the Neon Genesis Evangelion series, he left Gainax and worked as a freelancer for various TV series and OVAs. He was the character designer and animation director on the 1995 OVA series Oh My Goddess! which had five episodes, and then its feature film Oh My Goddess! The Movie in 2000. He would then reprise his role as character designer for the 2005 TV series which ran for 2 seasons.  He did the character design for the Sakura Wars anime television series in 2000, and for its various OVA location-based sequels including Paris and New York. In 2003, he provided the character design for the anime television series  Gankutsuou: The Count of Monte Cristo, where he was noted for his art style  full of lavish patterns instead of solid colors.

He provided the character designs for the anime film The Princess and the Pilot In 2006, Hideaki Anno and Yoshiyuki Sadamoto asked Matsubara to join Khara and he has been working there since then. He visited Anime Expo in 2001 and 2002, Anime Central in 2002 and 2003 and Anime USA in 2002. and would later return to the U.S. for Otakon and Animazement.

Filmography

Other media

Books 
  -2006
  -2010

Others 
  Hidenori Matsubara Sakura Taisen Collection 2003 art exhibit
 Takaoka City Sightseeing ambassador  - Character Design - 2012

References

External links 
 
 
 
 

Japanese animators
Japanese animated film directors
Anime character designers
Gainax
1965 births
Living people